Jennifer Sky (born Jennifer Wacha) is an American actress. She has had roles in Buffy the Vampire Slayer in 1997, General Hospital (1997–1998), Xena: Warrior Princess in 1999, and starred as Cleopatra, the title character in Cleopatra 2525 (2000–2001),  Fastlane in 2002, Charmed in 2003, and CSI: Miami in 2004 and 2005; She appeared as Vanessa Farrow in the last ever episode of Columbo in 2003.

Personal life
Sky was raised in Jensen Beach, Florida. At 15, she was offered two months of summer modeling in Japan. She left for New York City at 17 to study acting under the tutelage of several acclaimed acting coaches, and became well-versed in the Meisner technique. Sky married Alex Band of The Calling, but have since separated.

On September 10, 2013, The New York Times published an op-ed from Sky, entitled "My Life as a Warrior Princess", in which she compared the terrible working conditions she experienced as a teenage fashion model with the much superior working conditions she experienced as an actor. She described how inspirational she found her work on the show Xena: Warrior Princess.

Career
Sky has appeared on television in Buffy the Vampire Slayerin 1997, She has portrayed Sarah Webber on the ABC daytime soap opera General Hospital (1997–1998), Xena: Warrior Princess in 1999,  and starred as Cleopatra, the title character in the American syndicated science-fiction television series Cleopatra 2525 from 2000-2001, Fastlane in 2002, Charmed in 2003, and CSI: Miami in 2004 and 2005.

Sky appeared as Vanessa Farrow in "Columbo Likes the Nightlife", the last ever episode of Columbo in 2003.

She was ranked number 90 on the Maxim Hot 100 Women of 2003.

Health
She has written for her hometown newspaper, The Stuart News. She is featured in the opinion section. According to her October 2010 column in the paper, she has suffered from severe health problems and now lives and studies in New York City.

Activism
In February 2014, she posted a video to YouTube  in which she describes the emotional, professional, and sexual mistreatment she feels she has suffered over the course of her career. In the video, Sky denounces the fashion-model industry, and calls on viewers to fight for the creation of labor unions for models, stricter regulations on the employment of children, and an end to what she describes as the systematic abuses of the industry.

Filmography

Film

Television

References

External links

Actresses from Florida
American film actresses
American television actresses
Living people
People from Jensen Beach, Florida
21st-century American women
Year of birth missing (living people)